Crystal Lake Community Consolidated School District 47 is a school district containing elementary and middle schools. The district serves Crystal Lake, Lakewood, as well as parts of Lake in the Hills, Cary, Woodstock, Huntley, Bull Valley, and McHenry.

District 47 has an area of 44 square miles, and has a student population of about 7,800 students from Pre-K through 8th grade, as well as about 1,100 staff and administrators. The current Superintendent is Dr. Kathy Hinz.

History

The creation of District 47 took place during the late 19th and early 20th centuries.

Schools
In District 47, there are nine elementary schools, three middle schools, and one early childhood center.

Elementary schools
North Elementary School, established 1954
South Elementary School, established 1952
West Elementary School, established 1963
Husmann Elementary School, established 1949 (as Central Elementary School)
Canterbury Elementary School, established 1971
Coventry Elementary School, established 1967
Woods Creek Elementary School, established 1997
Indian Prairie Elementary School, established 1991
Glacier Ridge Elementary School, established 2001

Middle schools

Richard F. Bernotas Middle School
Richard F. Bernotas Middle School, also referred to as Bernotas Middle School, was established in 1969. Its first name was North Junior High, but in 2002, it was dedicated to Richard F. Bernotas. There are about 1000 students in it.  Bernotas's sports teams go under the "Bernotas Vikings". Their mascot is Thor, represented by a viking. The school colors are blue and gold. Unlike the three middle schools in the district, RFB has its own unique school song, and not a rewrite of lyrics.

Leon J. Lundahl Middle School
Leon J. Lundahl Middle School, also referred to as Lundahl Middle School, was established in 1959 as South Junior High. The name was switched to Lundahl Middle School after the retirement of Leon J. Lundahl, the superintendent in 1966. Lundahl Middle School was the first school to be named after someone at the time.

In 1974, a new addition including a new gymnasium, learning center, locker room  area, and science complex was opened. Mr. Richard Carlstedt became principal in 1989. In 1990-91, a new north end classroom addition, cafeteria, locker room area, and second gymnasium were added to the Lundahl campus.  The school became an accredited middle school in the spring of 1995, and its name was officially changed to Lundahl Middle School Campus for the opening of the 1996-97 school year.

Lundahl's colors are purple and gold, and they compete in athletics as the Lundahl Lions, female-oriented sports teams being referred to as the Lady Lions. Lundahl's mascot is a lion, whose name is Leo. Leo comes from the name Leon J. Lundahl, the retiring superintendent in 1966.

Hannah Beardsley Middle School
Hannah Beardsley Middle School opened in 1996, the most recent middle school in Crystal Lake. Its namesake, Hannah Beardsley, was the first school teacher in the Crystal Lake area. The first principal of Hannah Beardsley Middle School was Ron Ludwig.

HBMS was opened to accommodate Crystal Lake's burgeoning population, which had been fueled mostly by an influx of middle-class families from Chicago during the 1990s. When it first opened, Beardsley was already close to capacity. Rising enrollment necessitated the construction of an additional wing of classrooms on the building's upper floor, which was completed in 2000. Present enrollment is over 1100 students in grades 6 through 8. Beardsley's sports teams compete as the Beardsley Bears, and its school colors are blue and orange.

References

External links 
 

School districts in McHenry County, Illinois
Crystal Lake, Illinois